IndiHome (abbreviated from Indonesia Digital Home) is a home telephone, internet, and Internet Protocol television services owned by Telkom Indonesia. IndiHome was launched on 2015 to replace Speedy. Its packages also come with digital music portal services and Home Automation.

IndiHome services can only be applied to homes in which there are fiber-optic networks available from Telkom (FTTH) and areas that still use copper cables. Telkom claims that IndiHome products have had up to 2,000 units ordered each day throughout 2015. As of May 2015, the number of IndiHome customers has reached 350 thousand customers throughout Indonesia.

Products
IndiHome provides the following internet packages:
Single Play: provides fiber optic connections with internet services (Internet on Fiber/High Speed Internet) with or without landlines.
Dual Play: provides fiber-optic connections with internet and home telephone services (Voice).
Triple Play: provides fiber optic connections with internet, home telephone and Internet Protocol television (IndiHome TV) services.

References 

Internet in Indonesia
Telkom Indonesia
2015 establishments in Indonesia